Thomas Kramer (born April 27, 1957) is a German-born real estate developer and venture capitalist, noteworthy for his part in the redevelopment of South Beach, Miami, Florida. Thomas Kramer's development projects include the Apogee, the Portofino Tower, the Murano Grande, and the Yacht Club.

Biography 
Kramer is the son of Frankfurt stockbroker Willi Kramer. He attended the Salem Boarding School. Then he took a brokerage apprenticeship in London and became a licensed broker. He  joined his father's firm, before moving on to Shearson Lehman Brothers. He founded his own company in 1986, TK Kapitalverwaltung GmbH.

In the early 1990s, Kramer purchased for $45 million large portions of South Pointe, the southern tip of South Beach, a high-crime and poverty-stricken area. The deal allowed him to consolidate his holdings in a land swap. It also cleared zoning to allow the erection of the tallest buildings south of Manhattan. The whole area was turned into a premier residential area.

In 2000, Verena von Mitschke-Collande and Claudia Miller-Otto, daughters of Siegfried Otto whose step-daughter was briefly married to Thomas Kramer, won a $90 million settlement against Kramer in a Swiss court. The plaintiffs had financed Thomas Kramer's real estate purchases in Miami, but when they intended to collect their money in 1995, Thomas Kramer tried to overturn the request and lost. When The Otto daughters launched the collect request in Florida, which included his 1.84 acres of Miami properties, Thomas Kramer transferred the majority of his assets to the Isle of Man.

In 2013, Kramer signed an agreement with Pakistani real estate tycoon Malik Riaz to build the first-ever Island City in Karachi, Pakistan, the Bundal & Buddo Islands, a deal worth US$20 billion. The deal fell through since Kramer failed to provide the necessary funds.

Kramer was subjected to a record fine for an individual from the Federal Elections Commission. He donated to political candidates as a foreign citizen. This is illegal under United States campaign finance laws. He claimed he had been unaware of the prohibition, pointing out that he is a prominent, public figure and known to be a German citizen. He turned himself in to the FEC and immediately requested the refund of all political donations. The imposed fine was agreed upon as part of a voluntary conciliation agreement with the FEC. Howard Glicken  pleaded guilty to criminal charges arising from the circumstance. He admitted soliciting donations from Kramer when he knew that Kramer was not a U.S. citizen.

In a hearing report made public in 2014, Thomas Kramer explained that he had lost all financial liability since that event. In August 2017, his house on Star Island was auctioned and sold for $40 million.

Other activities 
Thomas Kramer was appeared on the third season of The Real Housewives of Atlanta and the second season of The Real Housewives of Miami.

Philanthropy 
Thomas Kramer created the Thomas Kramer Foundation, his main charitable vehicle. He regularly rents out his Star Island mansion for charity events.

In 1992, Thomas Kramer purchased the Woman in an Armchair, painted in 1932 by Pablo Picasso, for $2.86 million, well below the expected price of $3.5 million to $4.5 million.

Personal life 
He was married to Catherine Burda, daughter of Franz Burda II, the son of Franz Burda I, founder of a well-known German publishing house.

See also 
 Apogee
 Portofino Tower
 Murano Grande
 Yacht Club

Footnotes

External links 
 Official site

German philanthropists
Stockbrokers
German businesspeople in real estate
Businesspeople from Miami
Living people
Place of birth missing (living people)
German emigrants to the United States
1957 births
Businesspeople from Frankfurt